The XPeng P7 is a battery-powered  compact executive sedan made by the Chinese electric car company XPeng, which started deliveries in the Chinese market on 29 June 2020.

Overview
The XPeng P7 debuted as a semi-concept car on the 2019 Auto Shanghai show in April 2019. The production version was launched in December 2019.

Production model
The XPeng P7 is a direct competitor to the Tesla Model 3. As the second model of XPeng after the G3, the range of the new sedan will be improved compared to the G3. The official release said that the size of the XPeng P7 will be larger than a mid-size car, with a wheelbase typical of mid-to-large size vehicles. The XPeng P7 made its world debut at the 2019 Auto Shanghai show. The car started deliveries to customers on 29 June 2020.

, listing images of an updated version of the P7 powered by lithium iron phosphate battery supplied by Contemporary Amperex Technology Co. Limited (CATL) surfaced. The lithium iron phosphate battery powered models share the same design and features of the regular

Sales
Sales in the Chinese market passed the 10,000 mark after less than six months.

Development 
On November 30, 2019, the XPeng P7 was unveiled at Auto Guangzhou 2019.

On February 19, 2020, the P7 began cold weather testing. On March 17, 2020, the P7 began US road testing.

Deliveries of the P7 in China began on June 29, 2020.

On November 20, 2021, the Xpeng P7 Wing limited edition was released.

Technology

Adaptive cruise control system 
XPeng P7 is equipped with an adaptive cruise control system. The adaptive cruise control (ACC) system is a safety system designed for avoiding collisions by collecting environmental data from vehicle sensors to control the velocity of vehicles.

AGX-Xavier central computer 
XPeng P7 has many sensors, radars and cameras for 360-degree environment detection. After the process of data collection, Nvidia Drive AGX Xavier, which is the central high-performance computer equipped in P7, would utilize and calculate data to perform P7's Xmart OS functions, such as automated driving and valet parking.

Autonomous driving assistance system 
XPeng P7's XPILOT 3.0 is an autonomous driving assistance system that features XPeng Navigation Guided Pilot (XNGP). According to the data offered by Marie Cheung, it has:
31 autonomous driving sensors;
12 ultrasonic sensors;
10 autonomous driving high-sensitivity cameras and sub-systems;
5 high-precision millimeter wave radars;
4 autonomous driving surround-view cameras.

These equipments give XPeng P7 omnidirectional perception to supervise the changes of the surrounding environment.

Awards 
The Xpeng P7 won the Xuanyuan Awards Car of The Year 2021.

In media
On September 8, 2022, the Xpeng P7 was added to the videogame Forza Horizon 5 as part of the Rami's Racing History update, initially obtainable for free by completing in-game seasonal events from the 8th to the 15th.

References

External links

 

All-wheel-drive vehicles
Cars introduced in 2019
Compact executive cars
Mid-size cars
Production electric cars
Rear-wheel-drive vehicles
Sports sedans
Coupés
P7